The Vietnamese Grand Prix was a proposed Formula One Grand Prix that was first due to take place in April 2020. The race was initially postponed and later cancelled due to the COVID-19 pandemic and the inaugural edition of the event postponed indefinitely. The Grand Prix was removed from the 2021 calendar because of the arrest of Hanoi People's Committee Chairman Nguyễn Đức Chung on corruption charges unrelated to the Grand Prix.

History
Plans for a race in Vietnam were first explored by former Formula One CEO Bernie Ecclestone, who abandoned the idea as there were already four races in  East Asia at the time (the Malaysian, Singapore, Chinese and Japanese Grands Prix). Ecclestone also acknowledged that the failure of the Korean and Indian Grands Prix left him doubtful of the long-term viability of a race in Vietnam.

The idea was revived after Liberty Media purchased the commercial rights to the sport from CVC Capital Partners in January 2017. The Vietnamese Grand Prix was announced in November 2018, becoming the first new race under Liberty Media's ownership. The race would join the existing Grand Prix held in Southeast Asia, the Singapore Grand Prix.

The inaugural Vietnamese Grand Prix was initially scheduled to be held on 5 April 2020 as part of a multi-year contract during the  Formula One season, but was then postponed and later cancelled due to the COVID-19 pandemic. The race was also omitted from the  calendar, published in November 2020, following the arrest, on corruption charges unrelated to the Grand Prix, of Hanoi People's Committee Chairman Nguyễn Đức Chung who was one of main stakeholders involved with the event. At that time, the Vietnamese Grand Prix's contract to appear on the F1 calendar was terminated.

, the race has not taken place. There is still no official announcement when or if the Vietnamese Grand Prix will make its debut.

Circuit

Formula One Grand Prix races are intended to be held on a  temporary street circuit on the streets of Hanoi. The circuit, going anticlockwise, was designed by Hermann Tilke in collaboration with City of Hanoi authorities. The circuit was initially to feature a hybrid of public roads and a purpose-built section which was planned to be opened to the public in the future. An additional corner was later added to the third sector of the circuit by organisers for safety reasons, making a total of 23 turns.

References

 
National Grands Prix
Motorsport in Vietnam
Cancelled motorsport events